Belonimorphis is a small genus of sea snails comprising four species:

Belonimorphis ballardi 
Belonimorphis belonimorphis 
Belonimorphis cubensis 
Belonimorphis touhoensis

References

Cerithiopsidae